Utricularia hamiltonii is an affixed aquatic carnivorous plant that belongs to the genus Utricularia (family Lentibulariaceae). It is endemic to the Northern Territory of Australia.

See also 
 List of Utricularia species

References 

Carnivorous plants of Australia
Flora of the Northern Territory
hamiltonii
Lamiales of Australia